The Soviet Second League (Soviet football championship (Second League)) was the third highest division of Soviet football, below the Soviet First League. The league was formed in 1971 in place of the Class A Second Group of the Soviet football championship just a year after the division was downgraded to the third tier. Previously, the third tier competition predecessor Class B was liquidated completely. The Second League remained in force until dissolution of the Soviet Union in 1991.

Overview

The Soviet third tier competitions were conducted since the establishment of the Soviet football championship among teams of masters in 1936. At first they were called as the Group V (Cyrillic letter of V) of the Soviet football championship, but was discontinued after the 1937. The experimental edition of the third tier competition was re-introduced in 1946 as the Third Group of the Soviet football championship. But the consistent competitions really took off in 1963 when the Class B of the Soviet football championship was downgraded to the third tier.

The most titles of the League won was two by 11 different teams out of various now independent republics.  The last winners of the League were FC Karpaty Lviv, FC Asmaral Moscow, and FC Okean Nakhodka.

Between 1963 and 1970 football competitions in Class B were split by republican principle at first as tier two, then as tier three, and at the end in 1970 it was downgraded to the auxiliary tier four (or lower tier three). Each territorial Class B competition had multiple number of sub-groups that were known as zones. Winners of each territorial (republican) Class B was granted promotion to Class A Second Group (First League). Also on occasions, there were relegation play-offs to allow rotation for the collective of physical culture (KFK).
 Class B of the Russian SFSR (1959-1970)
 Class B of the Ukrainian SSR (1960-1970)
 Class B of Union republics (1960-1967)
 Class B of Central Asia (1966-1970)
 Class B of the Kazakh SSR (1968-1970)
 Class B of Caucasus (1969)

In 1970-1971 the Soviet league system was restructured for lower leagues and Class B competitions were discontinued. Republican competitions were conducted with the Soviet Second League which consisted of multiple groups (zones). There was no explicit designation of zones as they were simply numerated. Initially the league consisted of six groups, but for the next couple of season was increased to seven before reducing back to six again. Normally winners of group were getting promoted to the First League.

In 1980 the league was expanded to 9 groups, winners of which qualified for a mini-tournament that consisted of three groups with three teams. The three winners of that mini-tournament received promotion to the First League. This format remained in place until 1989. 

Republican competitions continued to be conducted among collective of physical culture and were considered as amateur.

In 1990 the league again went through another transformation reducing the number of groups from 9 to 3, winners of which would have been promoted to the First League. Due to withdrawal of teams, promotion and relegation was disrupted and the 1991 season became the last.

Third tier competition names

1936–1937 Group V (third letter in the Russian alphabet)
1936–1937 Group G
1936–1937 Group D and Group of Cities of the Far East
1946–1946 Third Group
1963–1969 Class B
1970–1970 Second Group (Class A)
1970–1970 Class B
1971–1989 Second League
1990–1991 Buffer League
1990–1991 Second League B

Winners

Group V

Third Group

Class B

Second Group (Class A)

Second League

All-time table (top 20)
There were over 520 teams that played in the third tier competitions.

1Three points for a win. In 1973, a point for a draw was awarded only to a team that won the subsequent penalty shootout. In 1978–1988, the number of draws for which points were awarded was limited.

See also
 Ukrainian Zone - the Ukrainian Republican competitions of the Soviet Second League only, not including the interzonal tournaments.

References

External links

 
3
Defunct third level football leagues in Europe
1936 establishments in the Soviet Union
1991 disestablishments in the Soviet Union
Sports leagues established in 1936
Sports leagues disestablished in 1991